Anthony Coyne (born 1961) is an Irish hurling manager and retired player who lined out as a forward for club side Youghal, divisional side Imokilly and was a member of the Cork senior hurling team from 1980 until 1983.

Honours

Youghal
Cork Intermediate Hurling Championship: 1988, 1993 (c)

Cork
Munster Senior Hurling Championship: 1983
All-Ireland Under-21 Hurling Championship: 1982
Munster Under-21 Hurling Championship: 1982
All-Ireland Minor Hurling Championship: 1979
Munster Minor Hurling Championship: 1979

References

1961 births
Living people
Youghal hurlers
Imokilly hurlers
Cork inter-county hurlers
People from Youghal